Andrew Rebori's house bat (Scotophilus andrewreborii) is a species of bat found in Africa.

Taxonomy and etymology
It was described as a new species in 2014.
The eponym for the species name "andrewreborii" is Andrew N. Rebori (1948–2011), who "maintained a key interest in animals, especially bats."
The IUCN has questioned whether "andrewreborii" is the correct species name for this taxa, given the nomenclature rule known as the Principle of Priority.
The IUCN has stated that the correct name for this species may be Scotophilus colias, if using the Principle of Priority.

Description
The fur of its back is reddish or mahogany in color.
Its ventral fur is tan to orange, with the chin and sides of body darker in color.

Conservation
It is currently evaluated as least concern by the IUCN.
It meets the criteria for this classification because it has a wide geographic range, its range includes protected areas, and it tolerates human-altered landscapes.

References

External links
Images and a distribution map for this species

Endemic fauna of Kenya
Bats of Africa
Mammals described in 2014
Scotophilus